Nick Buckley, a Manchester charity worker
 Nick Buckley, character in Tumbleweed (1953 film)
 Nick Buckley, character in Peril at End House and Peril at End House (play)

See also
 Nicky Buckley